William Hayden, was the Adjutant General of the State of Connecticut from 1835 to 1836.  The Hayden family was a prominent family of Windsor, Connecticut and among the first settlers to the region.  The family traces its roots back to England and the services of King Henry VIII.

References
Hayden, Jabez, H. Records of the Connecticut Line of the Hayden Family 1888

People from Windsor Locks, Connecticut
Connecticut Adjutant Generals
American people of English descent